is a Japanese actress. She has won three Japanese Academy Awards: the 2000 Best Actress award for Railroad Man, and the 1979 awards for both Best Actress (The Incident) and Best Supporting Actress (Seishoku no ishibumi). She also won the award for best actress at the 12th Hochi Film Award for Eien no 1/2. At the 25th Moscow International Film Festival she won the award for Best Actress for her role in Owl. She has received a total of 12 nominations.

She was the favoured lead actress of director Kaneto Shindo after his previous lead actress, Nobuko Otowa, died in 1994, and featured in four of his films from Will to Live in 1999 to Postcard in 2011.

Otake has also acted on the stage. She performed during the last segment of the Tokyo 2020 Olympics Closing Ceremony along Tokyo’s Suginami Children Chorus, singing the song "Hoshimeguri no Uta" (Star Tour Song) composed by Kenji Miyazawa, as the Olympic flame was extinguished.  In 2021, Otake took the lead role of Dr. Ruth Wolff in a Japanese stage adaptation of The Doctor.

Personal life 

Otake was born and grew up mostly in Tokyo. In 1982 she married Seiji Hattori, a Tokyo Broadcasting director who died in 1987. One year later, Otake married Akashiya Sanma, but got divorced in 1992. In the early 1990s Otake lived with playwright Hideki Noda.

Otake has two children, Nichika, a son by Hattori and Imaru, a daughter by Sanma. After her divorce she kept custody.

Filmography

Film

Television

Dubbing

Live-action
Cats, Old Deuteronomy (Judi Dench)
West Side Story (1979 TBS edition), Maria (Natalie Wood)

Animation
Inside Out, Sadness

Commercials
In 2012, she became a representative for NTT DoCoMo's "Raku-Raku Smartphone", a smartphone aimed at the over-55s.

Honours
Kinuyo Tanaka Award (1992)
Medal with Purple Ribbon (2011)

References

External links

1957 births
Living people
20th-century Japanese actresses
21st-century Japanese actresses
People from Tokyo
Asadora lead actors
Recipients of the Medal with Purple Ribbon